Elizabeth Young, Baroness Kennet (née Adams; 14 April 1923 – 30 November 2014) was a British writer, researcher, poet, artist, campaigner, analyst and questioning commentator.

Life
Elizabeth Ann Young, Lady Kennet, was born in London on 14 April 1923, the only daughter of Captain Bryan Fullerton Adams DSO (22 July 1887 – 22 September 1971), and his first wife Audrey Marshall (12 June 1898 – 11 July 1929). When she was a small child, the family moved about with her father to his naval appointments. When he retired from the Navy, he was appointed Naval expert to the Disarmament Section of the League of Nations in Geneva. Her first school was a French school (where she became bilingual in French), her second school was the International School of Geneva ("Ecolint"); after that she moved to an English school further up the lane, St George's School, Clarens. She returned to England to attend Downe House, whence she won an Exhibition to Somerville College, Oxford, to read Philosophy, Politics and Economics, and was awarded a two-year War Degree. After three years in the Women's Royal Naval Service, Young worked with her future brother-in-law Peter Scott in the earliest days of the Severn Wildlife Trust at Slimbridge.

In 1948, she married the Hon Wayland Hilton Young, 2nd Baron Kennet (2 August 1923 – 7 May 2009), who inherited the title of Baron Kennet in 1960 on the death of his father, the politician Edward Hilton Young, 1st Baron Kennet. His mother was the sculptor Kathleen Scott, widow of Captain Robert Falcon Scott of the Antarctic., and daughter of Canon Lloyd Stuart Bruce and his wife Jane (née Skene).  Wayland and Elizabeth had one son, William Aldus (Thoby) Young, and five daughters; Easter Russell, educationalist; the sculptor Emily Young; Mopsa English, educationalist; the writer Louisa Young, aka children's author Zizou Corder, and artist, writer, environmentalist and videographer Zoe Young.

Lady Kennet had twelve grandchildren and one great grandchild, and lived in London. She spent her last few years writing a new book entitled Preemptive Mourning, which will be posthumously published. She continued to draw the view from her window, compose haikus, and blog until close to the end. A collection of her poems and drawings will be produced by her descendants.

Works

On marrying, Young began writing, starting with an article for Vogue on the Island of Giglio in 1950. She continued to write on a wide range of mostly political issues, especially on disarmament, arms control and maritime affairs, but also on other subjects such as churches in Old London Churches (John Betjeman's Book of the Year), and Italy in Northern Lazio (winner of the 1990 European Federation Tourist Press Book Prize) both co-written with Wayland Young. Her book of poems Time is as Time Does was published in 1958, and was Geoffrey Grigson's Poetry Book of the Year.

Following the publication of Old London Churches, a threat to Christ Church Spitalfields led her to set up and run the Hawksmoor Committee, chaired by John Betjeman. At roughly the same time, she was asked by Arthur Koestler and Paul Ignotus to set up the Tibor Dery Committee, to promote the release of imprisoned Hungarian writers. Both committees were successful in their aims.

Young was also an active member of many boards and organisations including the Advisory Board for Redundant Churches; the Advisory Committee for the Protection of the Sea; the Royal United Services Institution'; the Royal Institute for International Affairs; Chatham House; the International Institute for Strategic Studies; as well as contributing to various ad hoc political and conservationist groups – most recently the Stonehenge Alliance which has so far successfully protected the World Heritage Site from ill-considered road schemes.

Despite being neither American nor a scientist, she was an honorary member of the Federation of American Scientists.

Bibliography

Books

 Old London Churches, (with Wayland Young), Faber and Faber, 1956
 Time is as Time Does, Putnam, 1958
 Nations and Nuclear Weapons, 1963
 Farewell to Arms Control?, Pelican, 1972
 London's Churches – A Visitor's Companion, (with Wayland Young), Grafton Books, 1986
 Northern Lazio – An Unknown Italy, (with Wayland Young), John Murray, 1990

Articles/Contributions

 Vogue – May: Island of Giglio (Article), 1950
 Botteghe Oscure – Poems: 'At the Back Door' , 1958
 BBC Television: Seven Deadly Sins – No.1 Anger, No.3 Lust, 1960
 The Socialist Imagination (with Wayland Young), Fabian Society, 1960 (pamphlet)
 Disarmament: Finnegan's Choice (with Wayland Young), Fabian Society, 1961 (pamphlet)
 Nations and Nuclear Weapons(with Wayland Young), Fabian Society, 1963 (pamphlet)
 Japan Association of Current English – (Article), 1967
 The Control of Proliferation: the 1968 Treaty in Hindsight and Forecast (Adelphi Paper, no.56, 155), 1969
 Foreign Affairs – October. To Guard the Sea, 1971
 Pacem in Maribus: Arms Control and Disarmament for the Oceans, 1972
 Settanta 22: La Difesa Delle Acque, 1972
 Still No Disarmament, Fabian Tract 423, 1973
 Ministry of Defence – Memorandum: Offshore Tapestry Colloquium, 1974
 Journal of International Studies (LSE) – Millenium: Article, 1976
 ACOPS Memorandum: Report from Expenditure Committee of House of Commons – Measures to Prevent Collisions in Waters Around UK, 1978
 Greenwich Forum Conference: 200 Mile Exclusive Fisheries Limit, 1976
 RUSI Journal – Policing Offshore, 1977
 Bulletin of the Atomic Scientists – (Book Reviews), 1978
 Survival, 1978
 The World Today: Jurisdiction at Sea, 1978
 Britisk Synspunkt: The Stavanger Aftenblad, 1978
 Socialist Commentary: Disarmament – New Hope, 1978
 Revue de Defense Nationale – Avril: Les Sovietiques et L'Ocean Arctique, 1982
 Ulisse: Lazio Segreto, 1983
 Marine Policy – Review of North Sea Management, 1985
 Architectural Design – July. (Article), 1986
 Commonwealth Journal – (Review), 1987
 Vitterbo – Prince of Wales Summer School (Historical Background)
 Journal of Architectural Conservation Christ Church Spitalfields and Nicholas Hawksmoor (Articles), 1995
 Defence Review – Whose NATO Is It Anyway? (Article – with Wayland Young), 1997
 Journal of Architectural Conservation – November. Stonehenge: The Saga Continues (Article – with Wayland Young), 2000
 Memorandum on Missile Defence to Foreign Affairs Committee on Global Security: Non-Proliferation'', 2008

References

1923 births
2014 deaths
Alumni of Somerville College, Oxford
People educated at Downe House School
English women poets
20th-century English poets
20th-century English women writers
Chatham House people
Kennet
International School of Geneva alumni